The Medal "For the Capture of Vienna" was a World War II campaign medal of the Soviet Union established on June 9, 1945 by decree of the Presidium of the Supreme Soviet of the USSR to satisfy the petition of the People's Commissariat for Defense of the Soviet Union to reward the participants of the battles for the capture of the city of Vienna from the armed forces of Nazi Germany.  The medal's statute was amended on July 18, 1980 by decree of the Presidium of the Supreme Soviet of the USSR № 2523-X.

Medal Statute 
The Medal "For the Capture of Vienna" was awarded to soldiers of the Red Army, Navy, and troops of the NKVD, direct participants of the heroic assault and capture of Vienna as well as to the organizers and leaders of combat operations in the capture of this city.

Award of the medal was made on behalf of the Presidium of the Supreme Soviet of the USSR on the basis of documents attesting to actual participation in the capture of Vienna.  Serving military personnel received the medal from their unit commander, retirees from military service received the medal from a regional, municipal or district military commissioner in the recipient's community.

The Medal "For the Capture of Vienna" was worn on the left side of the chest and in the presence of other awards of the USSR, was located immediately after the Medal "For the Capture of Königsberg".  If worn in the presence of Orders or medals of the Russian Federation, the latter have precedence.

Medal Description 
The Medal "For the Capture of Vienna" was a 32mm in diameter circular brass medal with a raised rim on the obverse.  On its pebbled obverse at the top, a relief five pointed star.  Below the star, the relief inscription in bold letters on three rows "FOR THE CAPTURE OF VIENNA".  At the bottom, the relief image of a laurel branch going up the left circumference of the medal up to the second row of the inscription.  On the reverse at the top, a relief plain five pointed star, below the star, the relief date in three rows "13 APRIL 1945".

The Medal "For the Capture of Vienna" was secured by a ring through the medal suspension loop to a standard Soviet pentagonal mount covered by a 24mm wide silk moiré light blue ribbon with an 8mm wide central dark blue stripe.

Recipients (partial list) 
The individuals below were all recipients of the Medal "For the Capture of Vienna"

Marines Chief Petty Officer Ekaterina Mikhailova-Demina
Chief Marshal of Artillery Mitrofan Ivanovich Nedelin
Marshal of the Soviet Union Rodion Yakovlevich Malinovsky
Marshal of the Soviet Union Fyodor Ivanovich Tolbukhin
Colonel General Nikolai Petrovich Kamanin
World War 2 veteran physicist Vladimir Aleksandrovich Teplyakov
Sapper Vladimir Fedorovich Chekalov
World War 2 veteran, painter Piotr Konstantinovich Vasiliev
War correspondent Pyotr Andreyevich Pavlenko
Colonel Ivan Fedorovich Ladyga
Army General Semion Pavlovich Ivanov
Lieutenant General Georgy Timofeyevich Beregovoy
Lieutenant Grigory Yakovlevich Baklanov
Lieutenant General Kuzma Nikolayevich Derevyanko
Military photographer Yevgeny Anan'evich Khaldei
World War II veteran, film director and screenwriter Grigori Naumovich Chukhrai
Sailor Georgi Aleksandrovich Yumatov
Guards Captain Nikolai Semenovich Alferov
Lieutenant Colonel Sergei Aleksandrovich Andryushchenko
Major General Ilya Vasilevich Baldynov
Colonel Alexander Nikitovich Belkin
Lieutenant General Aleksandr Grigorevich Kapitohin
Colonel General Andrei Grigorevich Kravchenko
Captain Nikolai Petrovich Belousov
Private Nikolai Savvich Stepanov
Lieutenant Colonel Ivan Savelievich Bulaenko
Major General Benjamin Vasilevich Volkov
Colonel General Vasily Vasilevich Glagolev
Lieutenant Colonel Ivan Illarionovich Dolgov
Guards Warrant Officer Gennady Petrovich Zharkov
Captain Pavel Khrisanfovich Maksimov
Captain Roman, Eduard Arvidovich
Army General Vasily Filippovich Margelov
Petty Officer Nikolai Timofeevich Nevpryaga
Lieutenant General Karp Sviridov
Major General Grigory Flegontovich Sivkov
Lieutenant Colonel Aleksandr Sergeyevich Trynin
Warrant Officer Vladimir Ivanovich Fedorov

See also 
Awards and decorations of the Soviet Union

References

External links 
Legal Library of the USSR

Soviet campaign medals
Military awards and decorations of the Soviet Union
Austria–Soviet Union relations
Awards established in 1945
1945 establishments in the Soviet Union